Toric Robinson (born 6 February 1986 in Westmoreland, Jamaica) is a Jamaican footballer currently playing for Antigua Barracuda FC in the USL Professional Division.

References

External links
 Info Sport profile

1986 births
Living people
Jamaican footballers
Jamaican expatriate footballers
East Stroudsburg Warriors men's soccer players
Jersey Express S.C. players
Dayton Dutch Lions players
Antigua Barracuda F.C. players
Expatriate soccer players in the United States
Expatriate footballers in Antigua and Barbuda
USL League Two players
USL Championship players
Jamaican expatriate sportspeople in Antigua and Barbuda
Jamaican expatriate sportspeople in the United States
Association football midfielders
People from Westmoreland Parish